Thomas David Looney was an Irish Labour Party politician. He was first elected to Dáil Éireann as a Labour Party Teachta Dála (TD) for the Cork South-East constituency at the 1943 general election.

In 1944 the Labour Party split and Looney became a member of the new political movement, the National Labour Party. The split was healed when new party merged with the Labour Party in 1950. He stood as an independent candidate at the 1944 general election but lost his seat.

References

Year of birth missing
Year of death missing
Labour Party (Ireland) TDs
National Labour Party (Ireland) TDs
Members of the 11th Dáil